Perini Navi is an Italian shipyard based in Viareggio, Tuscany, Italy. Founded in 1983 by Fabio Perini, who pioneered automation and furling systems in large sailing yachts.

In December 2021 Perini Navi company has been acquired by the Italian public company The Italian Sea Group

List of yachts
This is a list of all the yachts built by Perini Navi and its subsidiary Cantiere Navale Beconcini, sorted by year.

1974-1994

1995-2004

2005-2014

2015 - Present

Under construction

Concept

See also
 List of large sailing yachts
 List of motor yachts by length
 Luxury yacht
Fabio Perini

References

Perini Navi
Built by Perini Navi
Built by Perini Navi
Perini Navi
Italian brands
Companies established in 1983
Italian companies established in 1983
Italian boat builders
Shipbuilding companies of Italy
Yacht building companies
Companies based in Tuscany
Viareggio